Wolmaransstad (Afrikaans for "Wolmarans City") is a maize-farming town situated on the N12 between Johannesburg and Kimberley in North West Province of South Africa. The town lies in an important alluvial diamond-mining area and it is the main town of the Maquassi Hills Local Municipality.

Town 245 km south-west of Johannesburg and 56 km north-east of Bloemhof. It was laid out on the farms Rooderand and Vlakfontein in 1888, and proclaimed a town in 1891. Named after Jacobus M. A. Wolmarans, then member of the Executive Council.

Wolmaransstad originated in 1891 on the banks of the Makwasi River (San word for a type of wild spearmint) and takes its name from J. M. A. Wolmarans, a volksraad councilman.

Wolmaransstad serves a large community and is an important diamond buying center.

The Dutch Reformed church building was designed by Gerard Moerdijk.

Anglo Boer war

Tourist attractions 
Broadbent Mission Station 
Digger's Diamond route 
Makwassierante Conservation Area
Wolwespruit Dam Nature Reserve

Notable people 
 Bernardus Gerhardus Fourie (also known as Brand Fourie, 19162008), born in Wolmaransstad, South African politician
 Wim Erasmus, South African singer
 Nel-Marie Nolan, née Erasmus, Wim's daughter, and wife of Riaan Nolan

See also 
 Wolmaransstad Commando, a former light infantry regiment of the South African Army based in Wolmaransstad

References

Populated places in the Maquassi Hills Local Municipality
Mining communities in South Africa
Populated places established in 1891
1891 establishments in South Africa